Igor Savić is a Serbian football manager.

Managerial career
Between 2015 and 2017, Savić worked in the youth setups at Red Star Belgrade. He became manager of Belgrade Zone League club Zvezdara in December 2017 and led them to promotion at the end of the season. In January 2020, Savić joined the coaching staff at Mladost Lučani. He subsequently served as manager of Serbian League West club Smederevo 1924 from July to December 2020.

References

Year of birth missing (living people)
Date of birth unknown
Living people
Serbian football managers
Red Star Belgrade non-playing staff
FK Smederevo managers
FK Zvijezda 09 managers
Serbian expatriate football managers
Expatriate football managers in Bosnia and Herzegovina
Serbian expatriate sportspeople in Bosnia and Herzegovina